Praying Hands can refer to:

Fine art
Praying Hands (Dürer), a drawing (ca. 1508) by artist Albrecht Dürer
A 60-foot bronze sculpture by Leonard McMurray on the campus of Oral Roberts University

Music
Praying Hands, a rock band led by singer/songwriter Kevin Roentgen
"Praying Hands", a song from the debut album by New Wave band Devo